The following is a list of episodes of the animated series Magic Adventures of Mumfie.

Series overview
{| class="wikitable" style="text-align:center"
|-
!rowspan="2" colspan="2" | Season
!rowspan="2" | Episodes
!colspan="2" | Originally aired
|-
!First aired
!Last aired
|-
|bgcolor="FF43DA"|
|bgcolor="FFFFFF"|[[List of Magic Adventures of Mumfie episodes#Season 1|1]]
|13
|September 22, 1994
|December 15, 1994
|-
|bgcolor="#CCFFCC"|
|bgcolor="#FFFFFF"|[[List of Magic Adventures of Mumfie episodes#Specials|Specials]]
|2
|December 23, 1995
|December 24, 1996
|-
|bgcolor="0000FF"|
|bgcolor="FFFFFF"|[[List of Magic Adventures of Mumfie episodes#Season 2|2]]
|26
|August 24, 1998
|September 8, 1998
|-
|bgcolor="660099"|
|bgcolor="FFFFFF"|[[List of Magic Adventures of Mumfie episodes#Season 3|3]]
|40
|September 9, 1998
|October 2, 1998

|}

Episodes

Season 1 (1994)
Note: These thirteen episodes were later re-edited into a movie entitled "Magic Adventures of Mumfie: The Movie" by BMG Home Video. This edit is officially given the name of "Mumfie's Quest" by Britt Allcroft Productions and was released under this name in 2014 by Lionsgate.

Specials (1995–96)

Season 2 (1998)
All episodes in this season were animated by Phoenix Animation Studios. Even though they were produced in 1996, they weren't aired until 1998. Lionsgate accidentally lists episode 27 as part of the D'Ocon episodes, when it was in fact animated by Phoenix. These episodes are listed in the order they are listed in the Season 3 episode "The Album".

Season 3 (1998)
Note: All episodes in the season were animated by D'Ocon Films Productions.

Prospective reboot
In May 2014, Britt Allcroft started production on a new season of Mumfie. On July 2, 2015, it was revealed that the kids' division of Zodiak Entertainment, which was behind shows such as Zack & Quack and Totally Spies!, had begun development of the show. In 2022, it was announced that the series had been pre-sold to many networks overseas.

References

Lists of British animated television series episodes
Lists of children's television series episodes